Aleksandr Vladimirovich Nenashkin (born 11 June 1969) is a Russian football manager and a former player.

Nenashkin played in the Russian First Division with FC Druzhba Yoshkar-Ola.

External links
 

1969 births
People from Yoshkar-Ola
Sportspeople from Mari El
Living people
Soviet footballers
Russian footballers
Association football defenders
Russian expatriate footballers
Expatriate footballers in Bangladesh
PFC Krylia Sovetov Samara players
Abahani Limited (Dhaka) players
FC Rubin Kazan players
Russian football managers
FC Volga Ulyanovsk players